Stanley Spooner (20 November 1856– 3 April 1940), was an editor and journalist. He was originally the creator and editor of an automobile journal in 1896 called The Automotor And Horseless Vehicle Journal. The title was changed to The Automotor Journal, in April 1902. In January 1909, he was the creator and editor of the first aeronautical weekly magazine in the world called Flight, now titled Flight International. After the success of Flight, his Automotor Journal was renamed The Auto. He was made a Freeman of the City of London, and a liveryman of The Worshipful Company of Coachmakers and Coach Harness Makers, on 15 January 1929.

Family and early life
Stanley Spooner was born at Campbell Lodge, in Rosherville, Northfleet, England, on 20 November 1856. The birth was registered on 1 January 1857. He was the youngest son of Frederick William Spooner, an accountant, and his wife Sarah Ann (formerly Janes).

Frederick William Spooner was born in 1814, at 20, Henry Street, Pentonville, and baptised at Edenham, Lincolnshire, on 28 August of that same year. Sarah Ann Janes was born on 7 June 1820 in Hoxton, and baptised on 30 June 1820, at St Leonard's, Shoreditch. They were married on 20 October 1841, at St Leonard's, Shoreditch. At the time of marriage, Frederick was an accountant, living at Cumming Street. Sarah Ann's address at the time of marriage, was Provost Street, in Hoxton.Stanley had four sisters, three brothers, and one half-brother. His half-brother was born on 9 September 1837, at 113, Britannia Street, just off City Road in Hoxton, and was given the same name as Stanley's father.

His father was also a Freemason, and was elected as the Worshipful Master of Enoch Lodge (No.11), on 13 December 1854 at the Freemason's Tavern, Great Queen Street, London. Stanley would also later become a Freemason.

On 8 May 1858, Frederick William Spooner was named with others, as one of the first auditors of The Railway Benevolent Society. This occurred during a meeting at the London Tavern. At the same meeting, a resolution was carried stating that the society should be called the Railway Benevolent Institution. Frederick was an auditor and accountant of various different companies. Stanley himself would later become an accountant before he became a stockbroker.

On 7 April 1861, he was aged 4, and living with his parents at Woodlands Villa, on Woodlands Road, in Isleworth. Also in the home on this date were Stanley's siblings Catherine Sarah, Harriet, William James, Henry, and Walter.

Frederick William Spooner had moved his family to Gravesend by October 1863. Catherine Sarah Spooner, his oldest daughter, was married to Thomas Toller Hurst Daniell.Stanley would later work with Thomas.And Harriet Spooner, Frederick's second oldest daughter, was married to Edward Watson. This double wedding took place at St George's Church, Gravesend on 10 October 1863.The Lincolnshire Chronicle on the occasion of these marriages in an article, described Frederick as  "F. W. Spooner, Esq., of Dashwood." This was the name of Frederick William Spooner's house in Gravesend, and was the same address that was written in the register for his father, when Stanley was baptised on 25 July 1865 at St Ethelburga's Bishopsgate, London. The baptism register also gave Stanley's birth date.

Stanley's sister Eliza Spooner was married to Richard Marcus Smythson at Gravesend on 10 October 1867. Richard was a son of Marcus Alfred Smythson. Richard's brother Frank John Smythson became the founder of the stationers Smythson of Bond Street in 1887.

On 2 April 1871, Stanley was still living at Dashwood, on Old Down Road, in Gravesend and listed as a "Scholar." He was in the home with his parents and the same siblings as in the previous 1861 census, apart from his sister Harriet. But also in the home during this census was Stanley's sister Ellen Spooner, aged 19, Thomas Toller Hurst Daniell, and his daughter Madeleine Hurst Daniell. 

On 2 and 3 October 1873, Spooner was a Steward at a Bazaar held at the Assembly Rooms in Gravesend. This Bazaar was held on behalf of St. James's Schools. It was opened by Lady Darnley the wife of John Bligh, 6th Earl of Darnley. The particulars of this forthcoming Bazaar, including the appointments of those involved, were detailed in the local Gravesend newspaper on 27 September 1873.

He was educated at King's College London, and also in France and Germany.

Career
In 1876 Stanley was living at 55, Great Percy Street, London, and was a Clerk to an accountant named Robert William Hudswell. His offices were at 23, Martin's Lane, Cannon Street, London. The name of his business was Hudswell & Co. In 1875 Robert took up the position of accountant of the Co-operative Credit Bank, Queen Victoria Street, London. On 5 February 1876, Stanley was called as a witness at the Mansion House, London. This was in the trial of Richard Banner Oakley, manager of the Co-operative Credit Bank. Richard was accused of obtaining money and securities through false pretenses.

He became a Freemason, and was initiated into the Chiltern Lodge (no. 1470), on 21 December 1880. Stanley's occupation was given as an accountant on entering the lodge, and his address was Little Piazza Tavistock Chambers, Covent Garden, Strand, London. In the 1881 Census taken on 3 April, Stanley was still at this address, with his occupation being a "Newspaper Advertising Manager."
When the Constitutional Club was formed in 1883, he was one of its original members.
Stanley was initiated into the Anglo-American Lodge (no. 2191), on 21 May 1889.Their regular meeting place was at the Criterion Restaurant, Piccadilly.  His occupation on joining was put down as an accountant and his address was 125, Strand, London W.C.

He then applied to be a member of the Stock Exchange, and was posted as a member on 24 March 1890. 
At first Stanley was a clerk, then a stockbroker and a junior partner of Thomas Toller Hurst Daniell, his brother in-law, from April 1891.Thomas was also a member of the Anglo-American Lodge. On 15 May 1891, it was reported in the London Evening Standard that they were declared defaulters upon the stock exchange. This was due to the fact that George James, a stockbroker from Southport who Hurst, Daniell, Spooner & Co were acting as agents for, absconded and failed to pay losses he made on his account. George James misappropriated £70,000, and was sentenced to five years in prison at Liverpool assizes on 28 July 1891. Thomas Toller Hurst Daniell died in Hastings, on 30 September 1892. The value of his effects came to just £10.

The Automotor And Horseless Vehicle Journal
On 15 October 1896, a monthly journal created by Stanley, titled The Automotor And Horseless Vehicle Journal, went on sale. It was published by F.king & Co.Ltd.  The publishing and advertising offices were then at 62, St. Martin's Lane, Charing Cross.  Spooner had become the Managing Director of this company before August 1897.

The first Sixpenny issue included a portrait and biography of Sir David Salomons, and also information about the 1896 Paris–Marseille–Paris Automobile race.
Underneath the title of Volume1, number 2, it stated the magazine was "A Record And Review of Applied Automatic Locomotion."
Along with the latest racing news, and book reviews, the magazine over the years included technical drawings, diagrams, and reviews of the latest forms of automated transport. It also gave general news about the latest laws concerning automobiles, and the latest news on automobile clubs. The journal had a section titled Correspondence, from the first issue. These were letters from the public, to the editor of the magazine, which Stanley would reply to in print in following issues. When Stanley Spooner started Flight magazine he would also have a Correspondence section from the first issue.

Stanley Spooner was a member of the Automobile Club of Great Britain and Ireland, from its beginnings. He was on that Club's committee from 1900. While on this committee, he became friends with Charles Rolls, and John Moore-Brabazon, 1st Baron Brabazon of Tara. The Aero Club of the United Kingdom was formed in 1901, and Charles Rolls was one of its founders. In its early years, this club was closely allied to The Automobile Club of Great Britain and Ireland. Charles Rolls, and John Moore-Brabazon, 1st Baron Brabazon of Tara, would go on to become pioneer aviators. Another pioneer aviator who Stanley went on to become friends with was Griffith Brewer, who was originally a Balloonist. On 8 October 1908 Griffith Brewer became the first Englishman to go up in an aeroplane. This occurred when he was a passenger to Wilbur Wright at Camp d'Auvours, 6.8 miles east of Le Mans in France. Griffith became friends of the Wrights, and Spooner was able to keep in contact with them via him.

From around 1900 The Automotor And Horseless Vehicle Journal had a subsection titled Aeronautics. This section published information relating to early accomplishments in aviation. 
The title of the journal was changed to The Automotor Journal in April 1902. It was sold weekly from 19 April 1902.Along with Motor Car related information, the journal also carried on detailing the latest accomplishments in aviation, until the introduction of Flight magazine. An issue from 13 September 1903, included information about the Wright brothers experiments. Earlier that same year, the issue of 16 May 1903 included an article about Alberto Santos-Dumont and his Airship Number 9.The 27 October 1906 issue of that section also included an article about his flight at Bagatelle, on 23 October 1906 in the biplane 14-bis. An issue from 18 January 1908 recorded the success of Henri Farman flying a 1-kilometer course in an aeroplane on 13 January 1908 at Issy, France and winning the Deutsch-Archdeacon prize. The issue of 25 April 1908 showed a diagram of official Wright patent drawings of their aeroplane.
From November 1908 eight weeks before Flight was published as a separate magazine, pages of The Automotor Journal that covered aeronautics, were bound in Flight covers. This was in order to establish copyright.

Flight
On 2 January 1909 the first issue of Flight went on sale. It was the official journal of The Aero Club of The United Kingdom. Stanley was on that club's committee in 1909. The magazine recorded information about Aero Clubs throughout the country, ballooning, and model plane aircraft flying competitions, along with other things relating to aviation.
On the first issue front cover was John Moore-Brabazon, 1st Baron Brabazon of Tara and a photograph of him flying his aeroplane. It recorded his flights at Issy, France, on 3 December 1908. Underneath the main title on the first issue was the sub-heading: "A Second Englishman Flies."The magazine credited Henri Farman as being the first Englishman to fly a heavier-than-air machine. Henri had English parents and was born in France. 

The first printed letter addressed to the editor of Flight in the Correspondence section of that magazine came from Frederick W. Lanchester. He objected against Stanley giving support in his columns to the word "aerodrome", being used to define "a big open space for flying machines." Stanley respectfully disagreed.

By 1917 the Flight offices had moved from St. Martin's Lane, to 36, Great Queen Street, opposite Freemasons' Hall, London.

During his time as editor, the magazine recorded the aerial accomplishments, among others of Charles Rolls, Louis Bleriot, Roland Garros, and Charles Lindbergh.

He retired as editor of Flight in April 1934, and sold the magazine to Iliffe & Sons. Stanley had already sold his magazine The Auto before this date. On 18 December 1934 at 36, Great Queen Street, an Extraordinary General Meeting was held. At this meeting a special resolution was passed that the publisher F.king & Co.Ltd  was to be wound up voluntarily and Spooner was appointed official liquidator for this purpose.

Marriage
Spooner married Bessey Maddox on 12 September 1907 at the Register Office of St. George Hanover Square, London. Bessey was a widow, and a daughter of John Craggs, a deceased leather merchant. Stanley's address at marriage was given as 119, Piccadilly. Bessey's address was given as 44, St. Martin's Lane. They were married by licence.

On 2 April 1911 Bessey was living at The Leys, Little Clacton, Essex. Stanley was not at that address during this 1911 census, but signed his name as the head of the household on the original schedule.
Bessey died in 1926, and was buried at Brookwood Cemetery on 16 September 1926. Stanley was later buried in the same plot. On 29 September 1939, Stanley was listed as a widower at his address in Little Clacton.

Death
Stanley Spooner died of  Thrombosis at University College Hospital , Gower Street, London, on 3 April 1940. 
He was buried on 6 April 1940 at Brookwood Cemetery. Probate was granted on 10 June 1940, with the value of his effects coming to £116,064, 6 shillings and 9 pence. Along with Stanley's property at 36, Great Queen Street, he was also of The Leys, Little Clacton, Essex, at the time of death.

Among bequests in Stanley's Will was one of £5,000 to the Royal Aeronautical Society. This was to set up an aeronautical research scholarship in his name.

References

Notes

1856 births
1940 deaths
English journalists